Mount Bernacci (Central Bikol: Bukid kan Bernase, Tagalog: Bundok ng Bernase), locally known as Tangcong Vaca (English: The cow's hump) and also known as Mount Hantik, is a mountain located in the province of Camarines Sur, on the island of Luzon in the Philippines. The mountain may be seen from numerous points along the Pan-Philippine Highway. 

Due to its thickly forested nature, the peak, like most of the Philippines' mountains, has not been properly studied. 

The area around Mount Bernacci has remained an area of conflict between anti-government rebels and the Philippine National Police till now.

Etymology 
The origin of the mountain's name is unknown, most likely because its alternative name is more well-known than the original. Derived from the Bikolano word Tankong (English: Hump) and Filipino word Baka (English: Cow), The well-known name comes from its similarity to a large hump on a Brahman cattle. The mountain was also referred to as Hantik in the Bicolano Epic Ibalong, which is a word that refers to ants of the Oecophylla smaragdina species.

Geography and watersheds 
The peak of the mountain is located in the border of two municipalities: Libmanan and Pasacao. In the communities indicated above, the mountain also acts as an important watershed.

The watershed covers 2,975 ha and is divided among four barangays: Libmanan's Duang Niog and Tanag, and Pasacao's Bagong Silang and Salvacion.

Caranan and Itulan rivers sources, as well as a lakelet named Caliryuhan, may be found in Barangay Bagong Silang's forest area. It serves as the drinking water supply for ten adjacent barangays in Pasacao, totaling around 1,000 households. 

Azul Spring, Muroc-buroc, and Olaniban creeks run through Barangay Salvacion, and the Tinalmud River runs through its plains.     

Tanag has Asupre Creek, Duang Niog has four springs on private land, and two streams in Sitio Mensuro, which is along the Malansad River's route. This mountain is also the water source of Herodes Waterfalls in Barangay Bagamelon and the Tinandayagan Waterfalls in Barangay Palong.  

The Libmanan-Pulantana Watershed encompasses the mountain as well as a larger watershed area. It covers 71,000 ha and is one of the Bicol River's major basins.

Climate

Biodiversity

Birds 
Sightings of several bird species, majority of which are endemic to the Philippines and northern Luzon, have been recorded on the mountain, this includes rufous coucal (Centropus unirufus), Philippine trogon (Harpactes ardens), coppersmith barbet (Psilopogon haemacephalus), Philippine hanging parrot (Loriculus philippensis),  yellow-bellied whistler (Pachycephala philippinensis), blue-headed fantail (Rhipidura cyaniceps), black-naped monarch (Hypothymis azurea), yellow-wattled bulbul (Poliolophus urostictus), white-browed shama (Copsychus luzoniensis), bicolored flowerpecker (Dicaeum bicolor), grey-throated sunbird (Anthreptes griseigularis), and flaming sunbird (Aethopyga flagrans).

Infrastructure 
A wind farm project has also been announced for construction on top of the mountain, which is estimated to generate 71.40 megawatts of electricity.

Mythology 
This mountain was referred to as Mount Hantik in the Bikolano epic Ibalong. According to the epic, the mountain was named after a large species of ants known as the Hantiks (Oecophylla smaragdina). The ants are thought to have lived in the Kalupnitan Caves (now Colapnitan) on this mountain, where Handyong drove and buried alive the crafty, sweet-voiced serpents who pretended to be charming maidens. The epic also claims that Mount Hantik, along with Mount Kulasi (now Colasi Peak) and Mount Isarog, erupted 4,500 years ago. The mountain may have possibly collapsed after the eruption, creating the smaller Mount Bernacci.

Incidents 
On March 8, 1965, a Filipinas Orient Airways Douglas DC-3A crashed and burned in the slope of Mount Bernacci, as it was approaching Naga Airport. The total fatalities were 10, including 3 crew members.

On December 15, 1993, a Philippine Air Force C-130H Hercules crashed on Mount Bernacci. The plane left Manila at 2:17 pm to deliver relief supplies to an area devastated by Typhoon Lola. The total fatalities were 30, including 6 crewmembers

References

External Links 

 

Mountains of the Philippines
Landforms of Camarines Sur